Helen Ward (September 19, 1916 – April 21, 1998) was an American jazz singer. She appeared on radio broadcasts with WOR and WNYC and worked as a staff musician at WNYC.

Early years
Ward came from a musical family and was a native of New York City. As a high school student, she sang with bands, including the one led by Eddy Duchin.

Career
Ward began singing with Benny Goodman in 1934, when she already had two years' professional singing experience. Impresario Billy Rose heard her audition for Goodman and booked the combination for the Let's Dance radio program.

In either 1936 or 1937, Ward married Alfred Marx, who in 1938 arranged for Goodman's Carnegie Hall concert to be recorded for her as a souvenir. That recording was released as a dual LP set by Columbia Records in 1950 under the title The Famous 1938 Carnegie Hall Jazz Concert.

During the 1940s, Ward worked with the bands of Hal McIntyre and Harry James. She became a radio show producer for WMGM in 1946–1947.

After her marriage to Marx ended, Ward later married the audio engineer William Savory. Savory was part of the team that invented the LP. Ward continued to do sporadic studio work and also worked briefly with Peanuts Hucko. Ward did occasional tours with Goodman in the 1950s, but effectively retired by 1960. She made a brief return in the late 1970s and early 1980s. She returned to singing at New York City clubs in 1979. In 1981, she released her final album, The Helen Ward Song Book Vol. I.

In addition to Marx and Savory, Ward was married to Daniel Murphy and Walter Newton.

Discography

As leader
 It's Been So Long (Columbia, 1953)
 The Complete Helen Ward on Columbia (Collector's Choice, 2000)

As guest
 Larry Clinton, Larry Clinton in Hi Fi (RCA Victor, 1957)
 Benny Goodman, Fletcher Henderson Arrangements (Columbia, 1953)
 Benny Goodman, The Golden Age of Swing (RCA Victor, 1956)
 Peanuts Hucko, With a Little Bit of Swing (RCA Victor, 1958)
 Harry James, The Uncollected Harry James and His Orchestra 1943–1946 Vol. 2 (Hindsight, 1978)

References

External links
[ All Music]
Jazz House obituary

1916 births
1998 deaths
American jazz singers
Singers from New York (state)
Benny Goodman Orchestra members
20th-century American singers
20th-century American women singers